X Factor is the German version of The X Factor, a show originating from the United Kingdom. It is a television music talent show contested by aspiring pop singers drawn from public auditions.

The show's inaugural German season started in August 2010. RTL broadcast the first two kick-off shows. The other episodes have been shown on VOX. Both channels are part of Mediengruppe RTL Deutschland. The seasons 1-3 of X Factor were produced by Grundy Light Entertainment, another RTL Group company. Season 4 is produced by UFA Show & Factual by Sky.

The auditions for the first season were held in April 2010. The show started on 20 August 2010 and ended on 9 November 2010 with Edita Abdieski being crowned the winner. The second season began on 30 August 2011 and concluded in November and was won by David Pfeffer. The third season began on 25 August 2012 and was won by Mrs Greenbird on 25 November 2012.

The show was cancelled after the third season in 2012 before eventually being announced for a revival in 2018 on its new home channel, Sky Deutschland. It premiered on 27 August 2018 on Sky 1.

On 7 December 2018, Sky 1 cancelled the series after one season.

Series summary
 "Boys" category
 "Girls" category
 "Over 25s" category
 "Groups and Bands" category
 "16-24s" category

Judges' categories and their contestants

In each season, each judge is allocated a category to mentor and chooses three acts to progress to the live shows. This table shows, for each season, which category each judge was allocated and which acts he or she put through to the live shows.

 – Winning judge/category. Winners are in bold, eliminated contestants in small font.

Season 1 (2010) 

The first Season started in 2010. The auditions were held in April 2010. The first show started on 20 August 2010. The Judges were Sarah Connor (-25), George Glueck (Groups), and Till Brönner (25+).

There are four phases:

 Auditions
 Bootcamp
 Judge's House
 Live Shows

Contestants 

The live shows commenced on 21 September 2010. The following artists made it to the live shows.
Ages are as of the date of the show (2010).

Key:

 – Winner
 – Runner-up
 – Third Place

 Big Soul consists of Nadine (28), Alexandra (33), Martina (33), and Michelle (35)
 LaFamille consists of Joel (35), Erkan (32), and Guido (31)
 Urban Candy consists of Roman (26), Marc (24), and Candy (25)

Season 2 (2011) 

The second Season started on 30 August 2011. The auditions were held in April/May 2011. The Show was broadcast every Tuesday and Sunday. The Judges were Sarah Connor, Das Bo  and Till Brönner.
That year twelve acts were a part of the live shows, and not nine. Furthermore, from the first to ninth live show the judges decided which act had to leave the X Factor.

Contestants

Key:

 – Winner
 – Runner-up
 – Third Place

BenMan consists of Benjamin (19) & Manuel (18).
Boyz II Hot consists of Daniel (18) & Nathanaele (19).
Nica & Joe consists of Joseph (31) & Veronika (24).
Soultrip consists of Blago (24), Martin (27) & Nunzio (24).

Season 3 (2012) 

The third Season started on 25 August 2012. The auditions were held in April/May 2012. The Show was broadcast every Sunday. The first show was broadcast at RTL. The Judges were Sarah Connor, H.P. Baxxter, Sandra Nasic and Moses Pelham.
That year twelve acts were a part of the live shows, split into four categories: Boys, Girls, Over 25s and Groups within Bands. Since this year only the public decided who would be eliminated, so there was no longer a final showdown where the judges could save an act.

Contestants

Key:

 – Winner
 – Runner-up
 – Third Place

Josephine consists of Christian (29), Daniel (33), Imme (30) & Victor (22).
Mrs. Greenbird consists of Sarah (28) & Steffen (36).
Rune consists of Marvin (18), Patrick (20), Sebastian (22) & Steffen (20).

Season 4 (2018) 

The fourth season of X Factor premiered on Sky 1 on August 27, 2018 and consists of a new judging line-up comprising former Modern Talking lead vocalist Thomas Anders, German-born Chilean singer Iggy Uriarte, singer Jennifer Weist and rapper Sido  It is presented by Charlotte Würdig and Bence Istenes, who replaced former host Jochen Schropp.

There are three phases:

 Auditions
 Chair Challenge
 Live Shows

Contestants

Key:
 – Winner
 – Runner-up
 – Third place

References

External links 
 Official German X Factor site

German reality television series
Germany
Television series by Fremantle (company)
2010 German television series debuts
German-language television shows
VOX (German TV channel) original programming
RTL (German TV channel) original programming
German television series based on British television series